Bearfoot was a Juno Award-nominated Canadian rock band, founded by Jim Atkinson, Terry Danko, Dwayne Ford, Hugh Brockie and Brian Hilton. Initially going by "Atkinson, Danko and Ford", they changed their name out of practicality and because they didn't want to sound as though they were a law-firm. They released three albums and five singles through Columbia Records.

Biography
The founding members came together as part of Ronnie Hawkins' Rock and Roll Revival and Travelling Medicine Show, first meeting at the Graham Bell Hotel in Brantford, Ontario. Hawkins' group played the upstairs lounge that day while Danko and Atkinson's group, Tin Pan Alley, played downstairs. Hawkins hired the two as part of his group, which Ford, Brockie and Hilton were already part of.

Bearfoot eventually formed in 1969 and left Hawkins to sign with Columbia. They released three albums and five singles through the label. Their first, 1972 album was released under the name "Atkinson, Danko and Ford (with Brockie and Hilton)". They were nominated for the 1974 Juno Award for Most Promising Group of the Year, which Bachman-Turner Overdrive would win. Danko and Atkinson left in 1973 to pursue work as musicians in California. The group continued without them, releasing their final album as "Dwayne Ford and Bearfoot" in 1975. Danko and Atkinson returned to Canada in 1985 and reformed the band for a time with Jerry Baird. The group is now presumably defunct.

Discography

Albums

Singles

Compilation inclusions

Citations

External links
"Bearfoot". Canadian Pop Encyclopedia. Great White Noise. Retrieved 2010-12-16.
"CanConrox entry" 
"CanConRox entry for Dwayne Ford"
"Bearfoot". Allmusic.com. Retrieved 2010-12-16.
"Atkinson, Danko And Ford (With Brockie And Hilton)". Canadian Pop Encyclopedia. Great White Noise. Retrieved 2010-12-16.
"Danko, Terry". Canadian Pop Encyclopedia. Great White Noise. Retrieved 2010-12-16.
"Ford, Dwayne". Canadian Pop Encyclopedia. Great White Noise. Retrieved 2010-12-16.
"Terry Danko - Authorized Biography". Caffin, Carol. theband.hiof.no. Retrieved 2010-12-16.

1985 in Canadian music
Musical groups established in 1969
Musical groups disestablished in 1975
Musical groups from Toronto
Canadian country rock groups
1969 establishments in Ontario
1975 disestablishments in Ontario